Guy Pierre de Coëtnempren, comte de Kersaint (26 November 1747 – 24 August 1822)  was a French Navy officer, brother of Navy officer and politician Armand-Guy-Simon de Coetnempren, comte de Kersaint. He took part in the American war of independence.

Biography 

He did not accept the principles of the French Revolution, so he emigrated. He was restored to his rank in the French Navy in 1803, and died in 1822, after having been prefect maritime of Antwerp, and prefect of the départment of Meurthe.

Notes, citations, and references
Notes

Citations

References
 

1747 births
1822 deaths
Counts of Kersaint
French Navy officers
French military personnel of the American Revolutionary War
French naval commanders of the Napoleonic Wars
Kersaint